The 1979 Mediterranean Games, officially known as the VIII Mediterranean Games, and commonly known as Split 1979, were the 8th Mediterranean Games. The Games were held in Split, Yugoslavia, from 15 to 29 September 1979, where 2,408 athletes (2,009 men and 399 women) from 14 countries participated. There were a total of 192 medal events from 26 different sports.

The games' mascot was a Mediterranean monk seal named Adrijana.

Sports
The sports program featured 192 events. The number in parentheses next to the sport is the number of medal events per sport.

Medal table

Participating nations
The following is a list of nations that participated in the 1979 Mediterranean Games:

References
 Serbian Olympic Committee

External links
International Mediterranean Games Committee
Mediterranean Games Athletic results at gbrathletics website

 
M
Mediterranean Games
M
M
Sport in Split, Croatia
Multi-sport events in Yugoslavia
Mediterranean Games by year
Mediterranean Games